In mathematics and physics, the Kadomtsev–Petviashvili equation (often abbreviated as KP equation) is a partial differential equation to describe nonlinear wave motion. Named after Boris Borisovich Kadomtsev and Vladimir Iosifovich Petviashvili, the KP equation is usually written as:

where .  The above form shows that the KP equation is a generalization to two spatial dimensions, x and y, of the one-dimensional Korteweg–de Vries (KdV) equation. To be physically meaningful, the wave propagation direction has to be not-too-far from the x direction, i.e. with only slow variations of solutions in the y direction.    

Like the KdV equation, the KP equation is completely integrable. It can also be solved using the inverse scattering transform much like the nonlinear Schrödinger equation.

In 2002, the regularized version of the KP equation, naturally referred to as the Benjamin -Bona-Mahony-Kadomtsev–Petviashvili equation (or simply the BBM-KP equation), was introduced as an alternative model for small amplitude long waves in shallow water moving mainly in the x direction in 2+1 space.

where . The BBM-KP equation provides an alternative to the usual KP equation, in a similar way that the Benjamin–Bona–Mahony equation is related to the classical Korteweg–de Vries equation, as the linearized dispersion relation of the BBM-KP is a good approximation to that of the KP but does not exhibit the unwanted limiting behavior as the Fourier variable dual to x approaches .

History

The KP equation was first written in 1970 by Soviet physicists Boris B. Kadomtsev (1928–1998) and Vladimir I. Petviashvili (1936–1993); it came as a natural generalization of the KdV equation (derived by Korteweg and De Vries in 1895).  Whereas in the KdV equation waves are strictly one-dimensional, in the KP equation this restriction is relaxed. Still, both in the KdV and the KP equation, waves have to travel in the positive x-direction.

Connections to physics

The KP equation can be used to model water waves of long wavelength with weakly non-linear restoring forces and frequency dispersion.  If surface tension is weak compared to gravitational forces,  is used; if surface tension is strong, then .  Because of the asymmetry in the way x- and y-terms enter the equation, the waves described by the KP equation behave differently in the direction of propagation (x-direction) and transverse (y) direction; oscillations in the y-direction tend to be smoother (be of small-deviation).

The KP equation can also be used to model waves in ferromagnetic media, as well as two-dimensional matter–wave pulses in Bose–Einstein condensates.

Limiting behavior

The limit  is called the dispersionless limit.

Suppose the amplitude of oscillations of a solution is asymptotically small —  — in the dispersionless limit. Then the amplitude satisfies a mean-field equation of Davey–Stewartson type.

See also
 Novikov–Veselov equation
 Schottky problem
 Dispersionless KP equation

References

Further reading
 . Translation of

External links
 
 
 

Partial differential equations
Exactly solvable models
Integrable systems
Solitons
Equations of fluid dynamics